Lancashire Thunder were an English women's Twenty20 cricket team based in Manchester, Lancashire that competed in England’s women's Twenty20 competition, the Women's Cricket Super League. Thunder played their home matches at Old Trafford and various grounds across the North West. They were captained by Kate Cross and coached by Mark McInnes, working with General Manager Bobby Cross. In 2020, following reforms to the structure of women's domestic cricket, some elements of Lancashire Thunder were retained for a new team, North West Thunder.

History

2016-2019: Women's Cricket Super League

Lancashire Thunder were formed in 2016 to compete in the new Women's Cricket Super League, partnering with Lancashire CCC. In their inaugural season, they finished bottom of the group stage, winning just one game. In 2017, they fared even worse, failing to win a game as they finished bottom of the group once again.

2018 brought an expansion to the WCSL, with each side now playing 10 games, and Lancashire Thunder improved under the new format, winning 5 out of their 10 games. However, this still meant they just missed out on progressing to Finals Day, finishing 4th. Thunder bowler Sophie Ecclestone was the third highest wicket-taker in the tournament, with 15. In 2019, Lancashire Thunder once again finished bottom of the group, with no wins and one tie. Following this season, women's cricket in England was restructured and Lancashire Thunder were disbanded as part of the reforms; however they survived in spirit for a new team, North West Thunder, who represented a larger area, but retained some of their players.

Home grounds

Players
Final squad, 2019 season

 No. denotes the player's squad number, as worn on the back of their shirt.
  denotes players with international caps.

Overseas players
  Deandra Dottin – West Indies (2016)
  Hayley Matthews – West Indies (2016)
  Amy Satterthwaite – New Zealand (2016–2018)
  Jess Jonassen – Australia (2017)
  Lea Tahuhu – New Zealand (2017)
  Harmanpreet Kaur – India (2018–2019)
  Nicole Bolton – Australia (2018)
  Tahlia McGrath – Australia (2019)
  Suné Luus – South Africa (2019)

Seasons

Statistics

Overall Results

 Abandoned matches are counted as NR (no result)
 Win or loss by super over or boundary count are counted as tied.

Teamwise Result summary

Records 

Highest team total: 164/8, v Loughborough Lightning on 3 August, 2016.
Lowest team total: 71, v Yorkshire Diamonds on 12 August, 2016.
Highest individual score: 87, Nicole Bolton v Surrey Stars on 31 July, 2018.
Best individual bowling analysis: 4/17, Emma Lamb v Southern Vipers on 29 July, 2018.
Most Runs: 533 in 20 matches, Amy Satterthwaite.
Most wickets: 39 wickets in 30 matches, Sophie Ecclestone.

See also

 Lancashire Cricket Board
 Lancashire Women cricket team
 Lancashire County Cricket Club

References

Lancashire Thunder
Women's Cricket Super League teams
2016 establishments in England
Cricket in Lancashire
Sport in Trafford
Cricket in Greater Manchester
Sport in Blackpool
Cricket clubs established in 2016